Thomas David Schroeder (born May 26, 1959) is the Chief United States district judge of the United States District Court for the Middle District of North Carolina.

Education and career

Born in Atlanta, Georgia, Schroeder received a Bachelor of Science degree from the University of Kansas in 1981 and a Juris Doctor from Notre Dame Law School in 1984. He was a law clerk to George MacKinnon of the United States Court of Appeals for the District of Columbia Circuit from 1984 to 1985. He was in private practice, in Winston-Salem, North Carolina, with the law firm of Womble Carlyle Sandridge and Rice, from 1985 to 2007.

Federal judicial service

On January 9, 2007, Schroeder was nominated by President George W. Bush to a seat on the United States District Court for the Middle District of North Carolina vacated by Frank William Bullock Jr. Schroeder was confirmed by the United States Senate on December 14, 2007, and received his commission on January 8, 2008. He became Chief Judge on November 4, 2017.

Sources

1959 births
Living people
Judges of the United States District Court for the Middle District of North Carolina
Notre Dame Law School alumni
People from Atlanta
United States district court judges appointed by George W. Bush
21st-century American judges